Carlos Sandoval (born 21 January 1928) is a Guatemalan cyclist. He competed in the 4,000 metres team pursuit at the 1952 Summer Olympics.

References

External links
 

1928 births
Possibly living people
Guatemalan male cyclists
Olympic cyclists of Guatemala
Cyclists at the 1952 Summer Olympics